Lorenzo Zanni or Lorenzo Zane (died 1485) was a Catholic prelate who served as Bishop of Brescia (1478–1480),
Titular Patriarch of Antioch (1473–1478),
Bishop of Treviso (1473–1478),
Titular Patriarch of Jerusalem (1458–1473), and
Archbishop of Split (1452–1458).

Biography
On 5 June 1452, he was appointed during the papacy of Pope Nicholas V as Archbishop of Split.
On 13 March 1458, he was appointed during the papacy of Pope Callixtus III as Titular Patriarch of Jerusalem.
On 28 April 1473, he was appointed during the papacy of Pope Sixtus IV as Bishop of Treviso and Titular Patriarch of Antioch.
On 27 February 1478, he was appointed during the papacy of Pope Sixtus IV as Bishop of Brescia.
He served as Bishop of Brescia until his resignation in 1480.
He died on 15 October 1485.

References

External links and additional sources
 (for Chronology of Bishops) 
 (for Chronology of Bishops) 
 (for Chronology of Bishops) 
 (for Chronology of Bishops) 
  (for Chronology of Bishops) 
  (for Chronology of Bishops) 
 (for Chronology of Bishops) 
 (for Chronology of Bishops) 
  (for Chronology of Bishops) 
  (for Chronology of Bishops) 

15th-century Roman Catholic bishops in the Republic of Venice
Bishops appointed by Pope Nicholas V
Bishops appointed by Pope Callixtus III
Bishops appointed by Pope Sixtus IV
1480 deaths
Latin Patriarchs of Jerusalem
Bishops of Treviso